Nizhnyaya Kosa (Ulïś Kös) is a rural locality (a village) in Kosinskoye Rural Settlement, Kosinsky District, Perm Krai, Russia. The population was 91 as of 2010. There are 4 streets.

Geography 
Nizhnyaya Kosa is located 8 km north of Kosa (the district's administrative centre) by road. Kosa is the nearest rural locality.

References 

Rural localities in Kosinsky District